Vincenzo Renzuto Iodice (born 8 April 1993) is an Italian water polo player. He competed in the 2020 Summer Olympics.

References

1993 births
Living people
Water polo players from Naples
Sportspeople from Brescia
Water polo players at the 2020 Summer Olympics
Italian male water polo players
Olympic water polo players of Italy
21st-century Italian people